James H. Dieterich (born 1942) is an American geophysics professor emeritus at University of California, Riverside (UCR).

Early life and education
Born in Seattle, Washington, Dieterich studied geology at the University of Washington before going on to graduate work at Yale University. He earned his Ph.D in 1968. His doctoral thesis discussed the "Sequence and mechanics of folding in the area of New Haven, Westport, and Naugatuck, Connecticut." He then went to work for the USGS.

Career
Dieterich spent most of his career at USGS/Menlo Park. In October 1983 Dieterich made a trip to Costa Rica to evaluate recent University of California, Santa Cruz earthquake prediction models. His research, published in both his 1994 paper A constitutive law for rate of earthquake production and its application to earthquake clustering and his 1996 paper with Brian D. Kilgore entitled Implications of fault constitutive properties for earthquake prediction, theorized that the magnitude of a given earthquake and the rate of follow-on aftershocks occurred in inverse proportion, meaning that stronger earthquakes have fewer aftershocks. A study published in 2002 by Shinji Toda et al., addressing an earthquake swarm at the Izu Islands in 2000, confirms Dieterich's hypothesis. In 2003 he was elected to the National Academy of Sciences. In 2011, Dieterich's Department of Earth Sciences at UCR was awarded a five-year,  grant by the National Science Foundation to study earthquake fault system dynamics. Dieterich was named the principal investigator for the grant. The study design included the use of computer simulations to better model seismic activity at the San Andreas fault.

Publications

References

Educators from Seattle
1942 births
University of Washington College of Arts and Sciences alumni
Yale Graduate School of Arts and Sciences alumni
University of California, Riverside faculty
American geophysicists
Living people
Scientists from Seattle